Henri Letondal (29 June 1901 – 15 February 1955) was a French-Canadian actor, critic, playwright and musician.

He was born in Montreal on 29 June 1901, the son of Arthur Letondal.

He died in Hollywood on 15 February 1955.

Filmography

References

1901 births
1955 deaths
Male actors from Montreal
Canadian male film actors
Canadian emigrants to the United States